Orthobula impressa is a species of spiders of the genus Orthobula. It is native to India, Sri Lanka and the Seychelles.

See also 
 List of Phrurolithidae species

References

Phrurolithidae
Spiders of Asia
Spiders described in 1897